Bai Bibyaon Ligkayan Bigkay is a Lumad leader and environmentalist. She is the first and only female chieftain in the history of the Manobo people, and has been described as "Mother of the Lumads". She is an advocate of indigenous peoples’ rights and has been a defender of Manobo ancestral lands and the Pantaron Mountain Range since 1994.

Most Lumad elders do not know the exact date of their birth, but Bigkay is estimated to be around 80 years old as of 2019.

Leadership 
The Pantaron Mountain Range is home to one of the largest remaining virgin forests in the Philippines, and has been a target for logging operations. The range also supplies water to major rivers in Mindanao, including the Mindanao River, Pulangi River, Davao River, Tagoloan River, and major tributaries of Agusan River. In 1994, sought by tribal leader Datu Guibang Apoga of the Talaingod Davao del Norte, she led the Manobo against intrusion by logging company Alcantara and Sons. She was among the leaders that opposed logging operations that would have destroyed Manobo ancestral lands in Talaingod, Davao del Norte. In the decades since then she has continued alongside other Datus in defending indigenous communities of the Pantaron range against exploitation and militarization.

Bigkay led her people as they faced ethnocide, during their 2014 flight to UCCP Haran in Davao City after the Philippine military and paramilitary group Alamara attacked Manobo communities in Talaingod and Bukidnon. She also inspired other protests, such as the Manilakbayan ng Mindanao protest camp and caravan, and Sandugo, a national alliance of Moro and indigenous peoples of the Philippines. ("Sandugo" is a Visayan word which means "one blood".) She also organized other female indigenous leaders, forming the Sabokahan to mo Lumad Kamalitanan (Confederation of Lumad Women), and helped expand the Salugpungan Ta Tanu Igkanugon Learning Center, which now runs 50 schools for indigenous children.

Awards and recognition 
Bigkay received the University of the Philippines Gawad Tandang Sora award in 2017 for leadership in indigenous peoples' struggle for human rights and dignity. She was hailed as "the Tandang Sora of the countryside… the Mother of the Lumads who inspires the revolution of the Filipino people for national self-determination and freedom." The award is named after Tandang Sora, the "Mother of the Philippine Revolution", as an exemplar of patriotism and service to Filipinos.

She was also recognized as the Most Distinguished Awardee of the 5th Gawad Bayani ng Kalikasan (Hero of the Environment Award) in 2018.

Bigkay's honorific, Bai, is reserved for Mindanaon women of stature, and Bibyaon is Bigkay's title as chieftain of her tribe.

References 

Year of birth missing (living people)
Living people
Filipino environmentalists
Human rights in the Philippines
20th-century Filipino women
Indigenous rights activists
Women human rights activists
Indigenous activists of Asia
People from Davao del Norte
Filipino activists
Manobo people